Alcender O'Neal Jackson (born May 18, 1977) is a former American football guard in the National Football League for the Dallas Cowboys and Green Bay Packers. He played college football at Louisiana State University.

Early years
Jackson attended Moss Point High School, where he was a two-time Class 5A All-state selection at offensive tackle. As a senior, he helped his team achieve a 12-1 record, while receiving All-American honors from SuperPrep magazine and being named Mississippi player of the year by the Jackson Clarion-Ledger.

He accepted a football scholarship from Louisiana State University. As a freshman, he appeared in 5 games as backup. As a sophomore, he started 11 games at left tackle. As a junior, he started 5 games at left guard and missed 4 games with a sprained knee. As a senior, he started all games at left guard.

Professional career

Dallas Cowboys
Jackson was signed as an undrafted free agent by the Dallas Cowboys after the 2000 NFL Draft. In training camp, he was used at left and right guard. After making the team as a rookie, he was declared inactive for the first ten games and appeared in 3 of the last 6 contests. The next year, he was declared inactive for all of the regular season games.

In 2002, he was allocated to the Rhein Fire of NFL Europe. He received All-league honors at guard, after contributing to the team reaching World Bowl X and helping Jamal Robertson finish third in the league with 792 rushing yards and 8 touchdowns. The Cowboys waived him on September 1, 2002.

Green Bay Packers
On October 2, 2002, he was signed to the Green Bay Packers practice squad. He was released on October 9. He was signed to the active roster on December 4 after Chad Clifton was lost for the season with a severe pelvic injury. He was cut on December 23, after appearing in 2 games.

References

1977 births
Living people
People from Moss Point, Mississippi
Players of American football from Mississippi
American football offensive guards
LSU Tigers football players
Dallas Cowboys players
Rhein Fire players
Green Bay Packers players